Ten Years After is the debut album by English blues rock band Ten Years After. Recorded at Decca Studios in London in September 1967, and released on October 27, 1967, it was one of the first blues rock albums by British musicians. It has less original material than the band's later works, which were, in most cases, composed entirely of Alvin Lee's songs.

It features "Spoonful", a Howlin' Wolf song (written for him by Willie Dixon) that the British blues rock group Cream had covered the previous year on their debut album Fresh Cream with an extended live version on Wheels of Fire.

Track listing

Side one
"I Want to Know" (Sheila McLeod as pseudonym Paul Jones) – 2:08
"I Can't Keep from Crying Sometimes" (Al Kooper) – 5:21
"Adventures of a Young Organ" (Alvin Lee, Chick Churchill) – 2:32
"Spoonful" (Willie Dixon) – 6:00
"Losing the Dogs" (Alvin Lee, Gus Dudgeon) – 2:58

Side two
"Feel It for Me" (Alvin Lee) – 2:37
"Love Until I Die" (Alvin Lee) – 2:04
"Don't Want You Woman" (Alvin Lee) – 2:34
"Help Me" (Ralph Bass, Willie Dixon, Sonny Boy Williamson) – 9:46

2002 bonus tracks
Remastered CD, Deram 8828972
"Portable People" [Mono Single Version] (Alvin Lee) – 2:17
"The Sounds" [Mono Single Version] (Alvin Lee) – 4:29
"Rock Your Mama" (Alvin Lee) – 3:01
"Spider in My Web" (Alvin Lee) – 7:11
"Hold Me Tight" (Alvin Lee) – 2:18
"(At the) Woodchopper's Ball" (Joe Bishop, Woody Herman) – 7:46

Personnel
Ten Years After
Alvin Lee – guitar, vocals
Leo Lyons – bass
Ric Lee – drums
Chick Churchill – organ

References

1967 debut albums
Ten Years After albums
Albums produced by Mike Vernon (record producer)
Albums produced by Gus Dudgeon
Decca Records albums